Hoe Benham is a hamlet in Berkshire, England, and part of the civil parish of Welford.

Geography
Hoe Benham has a nature reserve on the Northern edge of the hamlet called Sole Common Pond.

References

External links

Hamlets in Berkshire
Welford, Berkshire